Riaz Haider (born July 2, 1934) is an American physician, cardiologist, author, and medical educator. He is best known for his work and research in the diagnostic cardiac ultrasound, heart pacemakers, exercise stress testing, and heart catheterization. He is the former President of the American Heart Association Nation's Capital Affiliate, and served as a Clinical Professor of Medicine at the George Washington University School of Medicine & Health Sciences from 1984 - 2011. He is an elected Fellow of the American College of Physicians, the American College of Cardiology, and the Royal College of Physicians. He retired in 2011 and currently resides in Potomac, Maryland.

Background 
Haider was born in Sheikhupura, British India (now Pakistan) in 1934. His father was a civil servant. He attended high school at the Government Central Model School in Lahore, Pakistan. He left Pakistan for the U.K. in 1957, and moved to the United States in 1966.

Education 
Haider attended the Government College University, Lahore, and then King Edward Medical University, where he qualified as a doctor in 1956 at the age of 22. He received training and conducted research in internal medicine and adult and pediatric cardiology in both the U.S. and the U.K.

Career 
Haider spent much of his career in the Washington, D.C. area and taught at University of Maryland Medical Center, Providence Hospital (Washington, D.C.), and George Washington University School of Medicine & Health Sciences.

He was Chief of Cardiology at the Providence Hospital (Washington, D.C.) from 1974 - 1993, and as President of Washington Cardiology Associates, P.C. from 1974 - 2008. Over the span of nearly 5 decades, he held appointments at the London Chest Hospital, Fatima Jinnah Medical University, University of Maryland, University of Birmingham, and Hammersmith Hospital in London.

At Hammersmith Hospital he directed the adult cardiac catheterization laboratories. The role included training cardiology fellows and researching diverse areas of heart disease. At GWU Hospital, with Joseph Lindsay, Haider introduced Swan Ganz cardiac catheterization in evaluation of cardiac function after acute myocardial infarction. At Providence Hospital he initiated new cardiovascular laboratories, which led to improved patient care.

Haider is Director Emeritus and former board member of the International Student House of Washington, D.C., which provides residential experience to a highly diverse community of American and international graduate students, interns, and visiting scholars.

He has published articles in The American Journal of Cardiology, the British Heart Journal, and Proceedings of the Society for Experimental Biology and Medicine. He released his first book, A Triumphant Voyage, Great Achievements in Cardiology  in April 2020.

Awards and honors 

 Smith, Kline & French Fellowship Award in Internal Medicine, 1966
 American Heart Association, Nation's Capital, Grant in Aid Research Award, 1973
 American College of Cardiology, Member of the Order of William Harvey, 1977
 Heart House Founder, American College of Cardiology 1977
 Gold Headed Cane Award, Providence Hospital (Washington, D.C.), 1992
 American Heart Association, Nation's Capital, Heart of Gold Award, 1992

Publications

Books 

 Haider, Riaz (2020-04-30). A Triumphant Voyage: Great Achievements in Cardiology. Riaz Haider. .

Articles 

 Haider, Riaz; Storey, Geoffrey (1962-06-02). "Spontaneous Fractures in Rheumatoid Arthritis". Br Med J. 1 (5291): 1514–1516. doi:10.1136/bmj.1.5291.1514. ISSN 0007-1447. PMID 13903699.
 Haider, Riaz; Singh, S. P. (1970). "Phentolamine In Heart Block". The British Medical Journal. 4 (5730): 307–307. ISSN 0007-1447.
 Haider, R Endotoxin Fever and Tolerance in Totally Adrenalectomized Rabbits. Proc.   Soc. Exp. BioI. & Med. 136, 2, 514, 1971
 Faithfull, N. S.; Haider, R. (1971). "Ketamine for cardiac catheterisation". Anaesthesia. 26 (3): 318–323. doi:10.1111/j.1365-2044.1971.tb04792.x. ISSN 1365-2044.
 Haider, R, Finnegan, P., Sanchos, P., Singh, S.P., Abrams, L.D. & Parsons, D., Twelve year follow-up of Tetralogy of Fallot after surgical Correction of Fallots Tetralogy in Childhood. Brit. H.J. 34, 2,205, 1972
 Khan, A. H.; Boughner, D. R.; Haider, R. (1972-11). "Effect of phentolamine on atrioventricular conduction in man assessed by recording His bundle potential". British Heart Journal. 34 (11): 1102–1106. doi:10.1136/hrt.34.11.1102. ISSN 0007-0769. PMID 4635346.
 Gorman, P., Byers, R & Haider, R. Exercise Electrocardiography. In Exercise Testing and Exercise Training in Coronary Heart Disease (Naughton, J. and Hallerstein, H., Ed.). New York Academic Press, 93–102, 1973
 Haider, R., Thomas, D.G.T., Zaidy, G., Cleland, W.P. & Goodwin, J.F. Congenital pericardio-peritoneal Communication with Herniation of omentum into the Pericardium.  Brit. Ht. J. 35, 981–984, 1973 
 Naughton, J. & Haider, R. Methods of Exercising Testing. In Exercise Testing and Exercise Training in Coronary Heart Disease ( Naughton,J. and Hallerstein, H. Ed.), New York Academic Press, 71–91, 1973
 Singh, S. P.; Haider, R. (1973-01). "The lack of value of hepato-jugular reflux as a sign of heart failure". Postgraduate Medical Journal. 49 (567): 10–13. ISSN 0032-5473. PMC 2495370. PMID 4731436.
 Khan, A. H.; Haider, R.; Boughner, D. R.; Oakley, C. M.; Goodwin, J. F. (1973-07). "Sinus rhythm with absent P waves in advanced rheumatic heart disease". The American Journal of Cardiology. 32 (1): 93–97. doi:10.1016/s0002-9149(73)80091-8. ISSN 0002-9149. PMID 4713117
 Gorfinkel, J.H., Haider, R. & Lindsay, J. Diagnosis and Treatment of Hemodynamic Abnormalities after Acute Myocardial Infarction. Medical Annals of the District of Columbia Vol. 43, No.8, 399, 1974
 Finnegan, P.; Haider, R.; Patel, R. G.; Abrams, L. S.; Singh, S. P. (1976-09-01). "Results of total correction of the tetralogy of Fallot. Long-term haemodynamic evaluation at rest and during exercise". Heart. 38 (9): 934–942. doi:10.1136/hrt.38.9.934. ISSN 1355-6037. PMID 786344.
 Haider, R.; Meyer, J. F.; Rasul, A. M. (1984-05). "Cardiac pacemakers: current concepts". American Family Physician. 29 (5): 223–228. ISSN 0002-838X. PMID 6731240.

References 

George Washington University faculty
American cardiologists
1934 births
Living people
King Edward Medical University alumni
Pakistani cardiologists
American medical researchers
Pakistani medical researchers
Physicians from Lahore